The 2002–03 Hawaii Rainbow Warriors basketball team represented the University of Hawaiʻi at Mānoa in the 2002–03 NCAA Division I men's basketball season. The Rainbow Warriors, led by head coach, Riley Wallace, played their home games at the Stan Sheriff Center in Honolulu, Hawaii, as members of the Western Athletic Conference. Hawaii finished in a tie for 6th in the WAC during the regular season and won one game in the WAC tournament before falling in the semifinals to Tulsa.

Hawaii failed to qualify for the NCAA tournament, but was selected to participate in the NIT, earning a postseason bid for a school-record third consecutive season.

Roster 

Source

Schedule and results

|-
!colspan=9 style=|Preseason

|-
!colspan=9 style=|Regular season

|-
!colspan=9 style=| WAC tournament

|-
!colspan=9 style=| NIT

Source

References

Hawaii Rainbow Warriors basketball seasons
Hawaii
Hawaii
Hawaii men's basketball
Hawaii men's basketball